Cavadxanlı is a village and municipality in the Imishli District of Azerbaijan.  It has a population of 1,097.

References 

Populated places in Imishli District